The 1981–82 Illinois State Redbirds men's basketball team represented Illinois State University during the 1981–82 NCAA Division I men's basketball season. The Redbirds, led by fourth year head coach Bob Donewald, played their home games at Horton Field House and competed as a member of the Missouri Valley Conference.

They finished the season 17–12, 9–7 in conference play to finish in fifth place. They were the number four seed for the Missouri Valley Conference tournament as Wichita State University was serving the first of a two-year probation and therefore prohibited from postseason competition. They made it to the championship game before losing to the tenth ranked University of Tulsa.

Roster

Schedule

|-
!colspan=9 style=|Regular Season

|-
!colspan=9 style=|Missouri Valley Conference {MVC} tournament

References

Illinois State Redbirds men's basketball seasons
Illinois State
Illinois State Redbirds Men's Basketball
Illinois State Redbirds Men's Basketball